The Republican Party (Spanish: Partido Republicano, PR) was a Bolivian political party founded in 1914.

In 1914, the Liberal Party (Partido Liberal, PL) split and its leading intellectuals and statesmen – Bautista Saavedra Mallea, Daniel Domingo Salamanca Urey,  and  General José Manuel Pando – created the Republican Party.

Platform of Republican Party was preoccupied with the recovery of Bolivia's lost maritime territories and typically demanded more morality in government, but its program differed little from traditional Liberal slogans. In 1917, the Republicans ran Presidential candidate but were defeated in the Liberal-controlled elections.

Republican Party grabbed power in a bloodless coup on 12 July 1920.

After the revolution of 1920, the Republican party split into two factions, each headed by highly personalistic political caudillos, both of whom coveted the presidency: José María Escalier of the Genuine Republican Party (Escalieristas), and Bautista Saavedra of the Republican Socialist Party (Saavedristas).

Notes

Liberal parties in Bolivia
Political parties established in 1914
Defunct political parties in Bolivia